"There'll Always Be an England" is an English patriotic song, written and distributed in the summer of 1939, which became highly popular following the outbreak of the Second World War. It was composed and written by Ross Parker and Hughie Charles. A popular version was sung by Vera Lynn.

History
In its lyrics, the song invokes various clichés of English rural life, liberty, and the Empire. It is best known for its chorus:

The song first appeared in Discoveries, a 1939 film by Carroll Levis, in which it was sung by the boy soprano Glyn Davies. After war broke out on 1 September, the song became a hit for Vera Lynn. Within the first two months of the war, 200,000 copies of the sheet music were sold. The song was used to express British patriotic defiance in the finale of Two Thousand Women, a successful 1944 film starring Phyllis Calvert and Patricia Roc about women interned by the Germans in occupied France.

Versions of the song were sung by Tiny Tim and the 1970 England World Cup Squad. The punk band The Sex Pistols came on stage to the tune in 2008.

References

External links
 Modern history sourcebook
 
 
 

English patriotic songs
1939 songs
1939 in England
Vera Lynn songs
United Kingdom home front during World War II
Songs written by Ross Parker (songwriter)
Songs of World War II
Songs about England